Blackpool Transport Services Ltd. is a bus and tram operator running within the boroughs of Blackpool and Fylde and into the surrounding area, including Fleetwood, Lytham St Annes, Poulton-le-Fylde, Cleveleys and now Preston with the introduction of the 74 and 75, which were previously operated by Preston Bus. It is owned by Blackpool Borough Council.

History

Blackpool Transport was founded in 1885 by the town council. The tramway opened on 29 September 1885 using a conduit system to operate the trams using electricity. However, due to difficulties with this method of operation, 550V overhead wiring was installed over the tracks in 1899 to replace the conduit system. In the 1920s, the first bus services were added to transport operations in Blackpool.

To comply with the Transport Act 1985, in 1986 the assets were transferred to a new legal entity. Neighbouring operator Fylde Borough Transport, which at the time traded as Blue Buses, was taken over in 1994; it had previously been a council-owned operation itself, but spent five months in private ownership before Blackpool Transport's takeover.

The company's network was relaunched in April 2001 under the name Metro Coastlines. Along with the new name came a new colour-coded service: each core bus route was operated by vehicles painted in a livery heavily featuring that route's colour. There were twelve such core bus routes, and the historic tramway along the promenade also had its own variation of the livery.

On Monday 26 July 2010, Metro Coastlines branding was discontinued and the company resumed trading as Blackpool Transport. Buses had their Metro Coastlines logos removed and replaced with a new Tower and waves logo, along with a black and yellow colour scheme. The tramway now uses a purple and white colour scheme since 2012, based on Blackpool Council's main colour schemes. The Tower and waves logo does not feature on the Bombardier Flexity 2 trams but is featured at the top of the central doors on the modernised English Electric Balloon trams.

Bus fleet

Blackpool Transport has a fleet of 132 active vehicles as of September 2018. It is majority double deck and entirely low floor, with the last step entrance vehicles being replaced in July 2016. Most of the vehicles in the fleet were purchased new by Blackpool Transport, however thirteen vehicles in the current fleet were purchased from other operators. In 2016, a five-year plan to renew the majority of the fleet was announced, with the aim of no vehicle in the fleet being older than five years old in 2020.

On the double deck side of Blackpool Transport's fleet, the Alexander Dennis Enviro400 City is the most common type, with 55 examples in service as of June 2018, with further examples due in the near future. Also in the double deck fleet are 27 East Lancs bodied Dennis, TransBus and Alexander Dennis Trident IIs and eight East Lancs bodied DAF DB250LFs, with the latter purchased from Bus Vannin.

The most common single deck type is the Alexander Dennis Enviro200, with eighteen examples in service. Other types include nine Volvo B7RLEs (Plaxton Centros) and ten high specification Mercedes-Benz Citaros.

Branding

Between 1933 and 2001, the fleet livery on the buses was green and cream, with different arrangements of the two colours decade after decade. From 2010 this livery was replaced with new black and yellow livery which replaced all of the route-specific liveries. Prior to the livery change each bus stop also featured the line colour and timetables were also colour-coded.

Route branding was discontinued in July 2010 when Blackpool Transport introduced major changes to its bus network, replaced by a new livery of black and yellow. The Line 6 service was axed in July 2010 after 84 years. Line 2 was axed in March 2015, with service 12/13 replacing parts of its route to Poulton via Staining. The 12/13 were axed a year later due to the withdrawal of LCC funding.

Palladium

In 2015, Blackpool Transport unveiled a new premium brand, Palladium, on its bus network. All vehicles with Palladium specification are fitted with WiFi, e-leather seating, wood effect flooring and a grey and yellow livery. The first route to be upgraded was the 5, which received a batch of brand new Mercedes-Benz Citaros.

The 7 and 9/9A were upgraded in 2016, with the latter receiving a batch of brand new Alexander Dennis Enviro400Citys. Other routes which have been upgraded to Palladium standard are services 6, 9, 11 and 14, with a mix of refurbished and brand new high specification vehicles.

The 3 and 4 were upgraded in June 2018, with the introduction of eighteen new Alexander Dennis Enviro200 MMCs.

Routes
Since 2002 local bus services have not used the 1960s bus station located on Talbot Road, however bus stops north and southbound are located just outside of it, where the majority of the bus network serve here. The town centre Blackpool Transport offices were relocated to Market Street. With the new service changes, many services now serve different town centre stops.

As of May 2017, Blackpool Transport operates sixteen routes on its network.

Tram fleet

Blackpool Transport also operates the Blackpool Tramway, which currently has a varied fleet of eighteen modern Bombardier Flexity 2 articulated low floor trams, nine modernised 1930s double-deck English Electric Balloon cars and an assortment of various heritage trams. Advertising has always been popular on trams, especially on the traditional trams.

Gallery

Buses

Trams

References

External links

Official website 
Flickr gallery trams
Flickr gallery buses

Tram transport in England
Bus operators in Lancashire
Transport in Lancashire
Transport in Blackpool
Companies based in Blackpool
Companies owned by municipalities of England
1885 establishments in England
Transport companies established in 1885
British companies established in 1885